Simon Yates (born 16 March 1970) is a Scottish golfer. Turning professional in 1989, Yates relocated to Thailand after holidaying in Asia and deciding to base himself in the region. He has played on the Asian Tour since its first official season in 1995. He placed third on the Asian Tour Order of Merit in both 1999 and 2004 and was one of the first ten players to reach career earnings of a million U.S. dollars on the tour. Although he has only won twice, he has 14 runner-up finishes on the Asian Tour.

Professional wins (6)

Asian Tour wins (2)

1Co-sanctioned by the Korean Tour

Asian Tour playoff record (0–4)

All Thailand Golf Tour wins (2)
2003 Cotto Open
2004 Singha Southern Open

China Tour wins (1)

Other wins (2)
1994 German PGA Championship

Results in World Golf Championships

"T" = Tied

References

External links

Scottish male golfers
Asian Tour golfers
European Tour golfers
Golfers from Glasgow
1970 births
Living people